Yang Xiaolei (born 28 June 2000) is a Chinese archer. She competed in the women's individual event at the 2020 Summer Olympics.

References

External links
 

2000 births
Living people
Chinese female archers
Olympic archers of China
Archers at the 2020 Summer Olympics
Place of birth missing (living people)
21st-century Chinese women